Common names: Müller's black-headed snake, Mueller's two-headed snake, Muller's snake.

Micrelaps muelleri is a species of venomous rear-fanged snake in the family Lamprophiidae. The species is endemic to the Middle East.

Taxonomy
There are no subspecies of M. muelleri that are recognized as being valid. M. muelleri is the type species for the genus Micrelaps.

Etymology
The specific name, muelleri, is in honor of Swiss herpetologist Fritz Müller.

Geographic range
Micrelaps muelleri is found in Israel, Palestine, Jordan, Lebanon, and Syria.

Description
Micrelaps muelleri is black, with whitish zigzag-edged rings, which may be narrower or wider than the spaces between them, mostly interrupted ventrally.

The dorsal scales are smooth, without apical pits, and arranged in 15 rows at midbody. The ventrals number 251–275. The anal plate is divided. The subcaudals, which are also divided, number 26–32.

The head is very flattened. The rostral is nearly twice as broad as deep, just visible from above. The internasals are a little broader than long, shorter than the prefrontals. The frontal is small, not broader than the supraocular, 1⅔ times as long as broad, hardly as long as its distance from the rostral, half as long as the parietals. Each supraocular is as long as broad. A small postocular is in contact with the first temporal. The temporals are arranged 1+1 or 1+2. There are seven upper labials, the third and fourth entering the eye. There are three or four lower labials in contact with the anterior chin shield. The anterior chin shields are as long as the posterior chin shields.

Reproduction
Micrelaps muelleri is oviparous.

Habitat
The preferred habitats of M. muelleri include Mediterranean-type shrubby vegetation, and arable land.

Conservation status
Micrelaps muelleri is classified as "least concern" (LC) according to the IUCN Red List of Threatened Species. Although its range is relatively restricted, there are not believed to be major threats to it. It is present in some protected areas.

References

Further reading
Böttger O (1880). "Die Reptilien und Amphibien von Syrien, Palaestina und Cypern ". Bericht über die Senckenbergische naturforschende Gesellschaft in Frankurt am Main 1880: 132-219. (Micrelaps muelleri, new species, pp. 137–138). (In German and Latin).

Atractaspididae
Snakes of Asia
Snakes of Jordan
Reptiles of Syria
Taxa named by Oskar Boettger
Reptiles described in 1880
Taxonomy articles created by Polbot